Criophthona aridalis is a moth in the family Crambidae. It was described by George Hampson in 1913. It is found in the Democratic Republic of the Congo (Katanga) and South Africa.

References

Moths described in 1913
Spilomelinae